Lake Hill or Lakehill may refer to:

 Lake Hill Elementary School, a school in Greater Victoria, British Columbia, Canada
 Lakehill Ball, a baseball and softball club for youth near Lake Hill Elementary School
 Lakehill Soccer Association, a soccer club in Greater Victoria, British Columbia, Canada

See also
 Lake Hills (disambiguation), several places
 Lakehills, Texas